North Crane is a small unincorporated community in Wea Township, Tippecanoe County, in the U.S. state of Indiana.

History
The town began as a stop on the Indianapolis, Cincinnati and Lafayette Railroad line running southeast out of Lafayette and was known as Culver's Station, named for a nearby landowner.

Geography
North Crane is located at 40°20′18″ N, 86°48′35″ W (40.338333, -86.809722) on the eastern edge of Wea Township. It has an elevation of approximately 679 feet.
One visible reminder of North Crane is the former Crane Station elevator, which can be seen from U.S. 52, just south of Lafayette.

References

External links
Map: 

Unincorporated communities in Indiana
Unincorporated communities in Tippecanoe County, Indiana